Mimonectidae is a family of amphipods belonging to the order Amphipoda.

Genera:
 Cheloscina Shih & Hendrycks, 1996
 Mimonectes Bovallius, 1885
 Pseudomimonectes Vinogradov, 1960

References

Amphipoda
Crustacean families